The 2001 South Carolina 2nd congressional district special election was held on December 18, 2001 to select a Representative for the 2nd congressional district to serve out the remainder of the term for the 107th Congress.  The special election resulted from the death of 16-term Republican incumbent Floyd Spence on August 16, 2001.  Joe Wilson, a state senator from Lexington County and a former aide to Spence, won the Republican primary and went on to win the general election against Democratic challenger Brent Weaver.

Republican primary
The South Carolina Republican Party held their primary on October 30, 2001.  Wilson won 75 percent of the vote, avoiding a runoff election.

General election campaign
The Republican Party was on the rise in South Carolina and there was a great deal of enthusiasm among its voters.  Additionally, the 2nd had long been a Republican stronghold; it had been in GOP hands without interruption since a 1965 special election.  Meanwhile, the Democratic Party was clearly on the decline and was expected to fare poorly in the upcoming 2002 elections.  Therefore, it was generally understood that Wilson had clinched a seat in Congress with his primary victory.

As expected, Wilson scored a decisive victory in the general election and he was sworn into Congress the very next day.

Election results

|-
| 
| colspan=5 |Republican hold
|-

See also
South Carolina's 2nd congressional district

External links
South Carolina Election Returns

South Carolina 2001 02
South Carolina 2001 02
2001 02
South Carolina 02
United States House of Representatives 02
December 2001 events in the United States
United States House of Representatives 2001 02